The following list is a discography of production by American record producer and film composer Sebastian Arocha Morton.

Written and produced songs

See also
Greg Kurstin production discography

References

 
 
Discographies of American artists
Latin music discographies
Pop music discographies
Production discographies